The Calgary Surge is a Canadian professional basketball team based in Calgary, Alberta, Canada, that will compete in the Canadian Elite Basketball League beginning in 2023. They relocated from Guelph, where they were known as the Guelph Nighthawks. They were renamed and rebranded as the Calgary Surge. The team will play at home at Winsport Event Centre.

History
On August 17, 2022, it was announced that the Guelph Nighthawks would be relocated to Calgary. The franchise will play home games at Winsport Event Centre. On October 19, 2022, they were officially named the Calgary Surge.

References

External links
 

Sport in Calgary
2022 establishments in Alberta
Basketball teams in Alberta
Basketball teams established in 2022
Canadian Elite Basketball League teams